The Fall of Númenor is a fantasy work collecting all J. R. R. Tolkien's Second Age writings together. It is edited by Brian Sibley. The book uses "The Tale of Years" in the Appendices of The Lord of the Rings to present the content of the Second Age. The stories include the foundation of Númenor, the forging of the Rings of Power, and the Last Alliance against Sauron that ended the Second Age. The editor, Brian Sibley, has provided new introductions and commentaries to unify Tolkien's writings. The publication contains ten new colour paintings by Alan Lee. The book published on 15 November 2022.

Publication 

On 15 November 2022, the first edition was published by HarperCollins. This version, illustrated by Alan Lee, has been curated and edited by Brian Sibley. The book comes with 11 colour images (10 and the cover), and dozens of new pencil sketches by Lee. The book's launch is timed to coincide with Amazon's The Lord of the Rings: The Rings of Power, which is similarly set in the Second Age.

See also 
 Middle-earth canon

References 

2022 fiction books
2022 fantasy novels
Books published posthumously
Collections of works by J. R. R. Tolkien
English fantasy novels
HarperCollins books
Middle-earth books